is a city in Iburi Subprefecture, Hokkaido, Japan. Date was established around 1869, and became a city on April 1, 1972.

History
Remains of settlements from the Jōmon period have been found in the Date area. The Ainu, the native inhabitants of Hokkaido, also maintained a settlement at another location nearby until the beginning of the 20th century, when the Ainu were mostly assimilated into Japanese society.

The name of the area comes from the Date clan, who rose to power in the 12th century in Fukushima, on the mainland. Before the Edo period, their home castle was the Yanagawa castle in Date District, Fukushima. Later, it became the Sendai castle. The Date clan ruled the whole of Miyagi Prefecture as well as the southern part of Iwate Prefecture, and was one of the most influential daimyōs.

During the Meiji period, many samurai, including the Date clan, lost their territories due to the political changes of the Meiji Restoration. In 1869, a branch family of the Date clan from Watari-Date moved to and settled at the south coast of the then-uncultivated Hokkaido. This was the foundation of Date.

On March 1, 2006, the village of Ōtaki, from Usu District, was merged into Date.

Geography

Date is home to Mount Usu and the Osaru River.

As a result of city and village merges, Date can essentially be divided into two sections: the Otaki Forest area and the Date Historic City area. Otaki Forest is home to Sankaidaki Falls and the Shirakinu River Bed. Date Historic City contains buildings that were built by the samurai, the most famous of which is the Usu-Zenkou temple.

Climate

Education

High schools
 Hokkaido Date High School
 Hokkaido Date Midorigaoka High School

Transportation
Date lies at the conjunction of National Highway Route 37 and Route 453. Date can be accessed via the Date Interchange from the expressway or via Date-Mombetsu Station operated by JR Hokkaido.
 Muroran Main Line: Usu - Nagawa - Date-Mombetsu - Kita-Funaoka - Mareppu - Kogane
 hokkaido Expressway: Usuzan SA - Date IC

Partner cities
 Watari, Miyagi (sister town)
 Shinchi, Fukushima (sister town)
 Yamamoto, Miyagi (sister town)
 Shibata, Miyagi (friendship town)
 Lake Cowichan, British Columbia, Canada (sister town)
 Hirakata, Osaka (cultural exchanges)
 Zhangzhou, Fujian, China (sister city)

See also
Tozama daimyō

References

External links

Official Website 

 
Cities in Hokkaido